Kelso Racecourse is a thoroughbred horse racing venue located in Kelso, Scotland. The official website describes the course as "Britain's Friendliest Racecourse". It was voted the Best Small Course in Scotland and the North of England in 2007, 2012 and 2014 by the Racegoers Club.

History
The first recorded race meeting in Kelso took place at Caverton Edge in 1734. Races were also later held at Blakelaw. The foundation stone of the stand at the current racetrack at Berrymoss was laid on the 12 July 1822. It was initially known as the Duke's Course.

On the 19 May 1913, Edith Hudson, Arabella Scott, Agnes and Elizabeth Thomson were arrested for trying to set alight to Kelso Racecourse. They were all imprisoned at Calton jail and went on hunger strike together. Scott was released under the Cat and Mouse Act on 24 May from Calton jail.

Kelso was a flat racing track until 1888, when the United Border Hunt moved to the course. Since then, Kelso has run exclusively under National Hunt rules.

Layout

Kelso consists of two sharp, left-handed tracks - a chase track of 1 mile 600 yards and a hurdle course of 1 mile 330 yards.  The course also has a punishing uphill run-in of 2 furlongs.

Grandstand
The classical style grandstand building was erected in 1822, though it was designed in 1778 by York-based architect John Carr (1723–1807).  The building, incorporating a private viewing area for the races' patron the Duke of Roxburghe, remains largely unchanged since its construction. In 2011 it was protected by Historic Environment Scotland as a category A listed building, as "the finest example of its building type in Scotland and a particularly rare and important survival in a wider UK context."

Notable races

One notable steeplechase is the King's Own Challenge Cup, named after the King's Own Scottish Borderers who were based nearby.

See also
List of Category A listed buildings in the Scottish Borders
List of listed buildings in Kelso, Scottish Borders

References

External links
Kelso Racecourse (Official website)
Course guide on GG.COM
Course guide on At The Races

 
Horse racing venues in Scotland
Sports venues in the Scottish Borders
Category A listed buildings in the Scottish Borders
Sports venues completed in 1822
Kelso, Scottish Borders
1822 establishments in Scotland